In mathematics and physics, in particular quantum information, the term generalized Pauli matrices refers to families of matrices which generalize the (linear algebraic) properties of the Pauli matrices. Here, a few classes of such matrices are summarized.

Multi-qubit Pauli matrices (Hermitian)

This method of generalizing the Pauli matrices refers to a generalization from a single 2-level system (qubit) to multiple such systems. In particular, the generalized Pauli matrices for a group of  qubits is just the set of matrices generated by all possible products of Pauli matrices on any of the qubits.
 
We use the tensor product notation 
 
to refer to the operator on  that acts as a Pauli matrix on the th qubit and the identity on all other qubits.  We can also use  for the identity, i.e., for any  we use .  Then the multi-qubit Pauli matrices are all matrices of the form
,
i.e., for  a vector of integers between 0 and 4.  Thus there are  such generalized Pauli matrices if we include the identity  and  if we do not.

Higher spin matrices (Hermitian) 
These generate the Lie group SU(2). 

For a general particle of spin , one instead  utilizes the -dimensional irreducible representation.

Generalized Gell-Mann matrices (Hermitian)

This method of generalizing the Pauli matrices refers to a generalization from 2-level systems (Pauli matrices acting on qubits) to 3-level systems (Gell-Mann matrices acting on qutrits) and generic d-level systems (generalized Gell-Mann matrices acting on qudits).

Construction 

Let  be the matrix with 1 in the -th entry and 0 elsewhere. Consider the space of d×d  complex matrices, for a fixed d.

Define the following matrices,

 
 

The collection of matrices defined above without the identity matrix are called the generalized Gell-Mann matrices, in dimension . The symbol ⊕ (utilized in the Cartan subalgebra above) means matrix direct sum.

The generalized Gell-Mann matrices are Hermitian and traceless by construction, just like the Pauli matrices. By dimension count, one sees that they span the vector space of   complex matrices, (ℂ).

In dimensions  = 2 and 3, the above construction recovers the Pauli and Gell-Mann matrices, respectively.

Sylvester's generalized Pauli matrices (non-Hermitian) 

A particularly notable generalization of the Pauli matrices was constructed by James Joseph Sylvester in 1882.  These are known as "Weyl–Heisenberg matrices" as well as "generalized Pauli matrices".

Framing 

The Pauli matrices  and  satisfy the following:

The so-called Walsh–Hadamard conjugation matrix is

Like the Pauli matrices, W is both Hermitian and unitary.  and W satisfy the relation

The goal now is to extend the above to higher dimensions, d.

Construction: The clock and shift matrices 

Fix the dimension  as before. Let  ,  a root of unity.

Integer indices may then be cyclically identified mod .

Now define, with Sylvester, the shift matrix

and the clock matrix,

These matrices generalize σ1 and σ3, respectively.

Note that the unitarity and tracelessness of the two Pauli matrices  is preserved, but not Hermiticity in dimensions higher than two. Since Pauli matrices describe quaternions, Sylvester dubbed the higher-dimensional analogs "nonions", "sedenions", etc.

These two matrices are also the cornerstone of quantum mechanical dynamics in finite-dimensional vector spaces  as formulated by Hermann Weyl, and they find routine applications in numerous areas of mathematical physics.  The clock matrix amounts to the exponential of position in a "clock" of d hours, and the shift matrix is just the translation operator in that cyclic vector space, so the exponential of the momentum. They are (finite-dimensional) representations of the corresponding elements of the Weyl-Heisenberg group on a d-dimensional Hilbert space.

The following relations echo and generalize those of the Pauli matrices:

and the braiding relation,

the Weyl formulation of the CCR, and can be rewritten as 

On the other hand, to generalize the Walsh–Hadamard matrix W, note

Define, again with Sylvester,  the following analog matrix, still denoted by W in a slight abuse of notation,

It is evident that  W is no longer Hermitian, but is still unitary. Direct calculation yields

which is the desired analog result.

When d = 2k, W * is precisely the discrete Fourier transform matrix, converting position coordinates to momentum coordinates and vice versa.

Definition 

The complete family of d2 unitary (but non-Hermitian) independent matrices  is defined as follows:

This provides Sylvester's well-known trace-orthogonal  basis for (d,ℂ), known as "nonions" (3,ℂ), "sedenions" (4,ℂ), etc...

This basis can be systematically connected to the above Hermitian basis.
map to linear combinations of the s.)

Properties 

With respect to the Hilbert–Schmidt inner product on operators, Sylvester's generalized Pauli operators are orthogonal and normalized to :
.

See also 

Heisenberg group#Heisenberg group modulo an odd prime p
 Hermitian matrix
 Bloch sphere
 Discrete Fourier transform
 Generalized Clifford algebra
 Weyl–Brauer matrices
 Circulant matrix
 Shift operator
Quantum Fourier transform
3D rotation group#A note on Lie algebras

Notes 

Linear algebra
Mathematical physics